The All England Open Badminton Championships is an annual British badminton tournament created in 1899. For four decades beginning 1954, the Championships was held at the Wembley Arena, London but since 1994, it has been played at the Arena Birmingham in the city of Birmingham, United Kingdom. The Ladies' Singles was first contested in 1900. Below is the list of the winners at the All England Open Badminton Championships in ladies' singles. The tournament was cancelled between 1915–1919 because of World War I, and between 1940–1946 because of World War II.

History
In the Amateur era, Judy Devlin (1954, 1957–1958, 1960–1964, 1966–1967) holds the record for the most titles in the Ladies' Singles, winning All England ten times. Devlin also holds the record for most consecutive titles with five from 1960 to 1964.

Since the Open era of badminton began in late 1979 with the inclusion of professional badminton players from around the world in 1980, Susi Susanti (1990-1991, 1993-1994) holds the record for the most Ladies' Singles titles with four. Ye Zhaoying (1997-1999) and Xie Xingfang (2005–2007) share the record for most consecutive victories with three.

This event was won without losing a single game in the entire tournament during the Open Era as many as ten times. The first to accomplish this was Lene Køppen who won the very first Open Era edition in 1980, followed by Zhang Ailing in 1982, consecutively from 1984 to 1986 by Li Lingwei, Han Aiping and Kim Yun-ja respectively, Gu Jiaming in 1988, Zhou Mi in 2003, Xie Xingfang in 2005 and 2007 and Wang Shixian in 2014.

Lene Køppen is the only player in history to reach the All England Open Badminton Ladies' Singles Final in both the Amateur and Open Era. She managed to do so a total of four times, winning in the last and first editions of the Amateur and Open Era respectively and also losing once each in both Era.

Finalists

Amateur era

Open era

Statistics

Multiple titles
Bold indicates active players.

Champions by country

Multiple finalists
Bold indicates active players.Italic indicates players who never won the championship.

Notes

See also
 List of All England men's singles champions
 List of All England men's doubles champions
 List of All England women's doubles champions
 List of All England mixed doubles champions

References

External links
All England Champions 1899-2007
BadmintonEngland.co.uk
badmintoneurope.com
Pat Davis: The Encyclopaedia of Badminton. Robert Hale, London, 1987, 

All England Open Badminton Championships